Odsherred municipality is a municipality (Danish, kommune) in Odsherred, Region Sjælland in Denmark. It covers an area of 355 km² with a total population of 32,881 (2022). Its seat is the town of Højby.

History
On 1 January 2007 Odsherred municipality was created as the result of Kommunalreformen ("The Municipal Reform" of 2007), consisting of the former municipalities of Dragsholm, Nykøbing-Rørvig, and Trundholm

Urban areas
The ten largest urban areas in the municipality are:

Politics

Municipal council
Odsherred's municipal council consists of 25 members, elected every four years.

Below are the municipal councils elected since the Municipal Reform of 2007.

See also
 List of churches in Odsherred Municipality

References 

 Municipal statistics: NetBorger Kommunefakta, delivered from KMD  Kommunedata (Municipal Data)
 Municipal mergers and neighbors: Eniro new municipalities map

External links 

 The new Odsherred municipality's official website (Danish only)

 
Municipalities of Region Zealand
Municipalities of Denmark
Populated places established in 2007